William Evans was an American baseball pitcher in the Negro leagues. He played with the Lincoln Giants in 1924 and the Baltimore Black Sox in 1925.

References

External links
 and Seamheads

Baltimore Black Sox players
Lincoln Giants players
Year of birth unknown
Year of death unknown
Baseball pitchers